Feminism in Pakistan refers to the set of movements which aim to define, establish, and defend the rights of women in Pakistan.This may involve the pursuit of equal political, economic, and social rights, alongside equal opportunity. These movements have historically been shaped in response to national and global reconfiguration of power, including colonialism, nationalism, Islamization, dictatorship, democracy, and the War on Terror. The relationship between the women's movement and the Pakistani state has undergone significant shifts from mutual accommodation to confrontation and conflict.

Background 
Pakistan ranks third-worst – 151 out of 153 – on the Gender Parity Index of the World Economic Forum (WEF) Pakistan's women literacy is so low that more than five million primary-school-age girls don't go to school. According to UNICEF, 18 percent of Pakistani girls are married before turning 18. The prevalence and incidence of forced conversion and marriage are difficult to accurately estimate due to reporting deficiencies and the complex nature of the crime. Estimates therefore range from 100 to 700 victim Christian girls per year. For the Hindu community, the most conservative estimates put the number of victims at 300 per year.  bridging the gender gap could boost Pakistan's GDP by 30 per cent, says IMF bailout programme for Pakistan.

According to Zoya Rehman, the image of Pakistani womanhood has been a construction of the Pakistani state since its inception. Pakistani woman, she argues, are expected to guard their sexuality, are controlled, and can even be murdered in honour killings when they do not meet cultural expectations. According to Afiya S. Ziya, this cultural orthodoxy is produced and sponsored by state, the government, and its agency the ISPR as propaganda engineered to influence the public in its own pre-decided way, and censor what it considers to be unsuitable. The state, she argues, does not stop at controlling the national narrative but intrudes public and private life to decide what is legitimate and permissible as 'Pakistani culture' and, what is not.

After independence, elite Muslim women in Pakistan continued to advocate for women's political empowerment through legal reforms. They mobilised support, leading to the passage of the Muslim Personal Law of Sharia in 1948, which recognised a woman's right to inherit all forms of property. There was an attempt to have the government include a Charter of Women's Rights in the 1956 constitution, but this was unsuccessful.  The 1961 Muslim Family Laws Ordinance covering marriage and divorce, the most important sociolegal reform to have had Feminist drive in Pakistan, is still widely regarded as empowering to women.

Forms of feminist expressions in Pakistan 
According to Maliha Zia, there are high spirited women's movements in Pakistan asking for equality and non discrimination, still feminism in Pakistan is part of over all women's rights movements and not the otherwise. Zia says feminism in Pakistan can be found in two forms one is Secular Liberal Feminism and the second is Islamic Feminism. According to Zia, Feminist movement in Pakistan can divided in 3 phases, the first one around 1947, the second one in post Zia period and third one since 9/11.

Phases of Feminism in Pakistan 

According to Ayesha Khan in first phase in initial  decades after the  independence women leadership was largely elite and invested in Muslim nationalism and strived for limited rights for women. Women civil society came into  confrontation with Government first time when dictatorial Islamization started affecting their rights negatively.

First phase: 1947–1952 
Muslim women were some of the most badly affected victims of Partition; it is reported that 75,000 women were abducted and raped during this period. It was soon after this that Fatima Jinnah formed the Women's Relief Committee, which later evolved into the All Pakistan Women's Association. Jinnah later founded a secret radio station, and, in 1965, came out of her self-imposed political retirement to participate in the presidential election against military dictator Ayub Khan.

Begum Ra'na Liaquat Ali Khan helped the refugees who fled India during partition and also organised the All Pakistan Women's Association in 1949, two years after the creation of her country. Noticing that there were not many nurses in Karachi, Khan requested the army to train women to give injections and first aid, resulting in the para-military forces for women. Nursing also became a career path for many girls. She continued her mission, even after her husband was assassinated in 1951, and became the first female Muslim delegate to the United Nations in 1952.

Second phase: 1980s 
The end of 1970s heralded a new wave of political Islamisation in many Muslim majority countries. In Pakistan, the military dictatorial regime of Muhammad Zia-ul-Haq gained power and initiated the Islamisation of Pakistan. These reforms replaced parts of the British-era Pakistan Penal Code, making adultery and fornication criminal offences, and introducing the punishments of whipping, amputation, and stoning to death. The feminist movement in Pakistan highly opposed this implementation of Islam, which was they believed to be based on an archaic understanding of Islamic literature, asking instead for liberal modernist interpretation. After much controversy and criticism, parts of the law were considerably revised by the 2006 Women's Protection Bill.

In this context, the vocal Women's Action Forum (WAF) was formed in 1981  According to Madihah Akhter, General Zia ultimately sought to morally police the role of women in the public sphere, which brought unexpected pressure on Pakistani women. As a reaction to the form of Zia's  Islamisation, many Pakistani women, including writers, academics, and performers, became active in the opposition of these policies. Akhter argue that the younger generation of 1980s activists were more feminist in their outlook and approach; the Women's Action Forum, she says, used "progressive interpretations of Islam" to counter the state's implementation of religiously interpreted morality, and in doing so, succeeded in gaining the unexpected support of right wing Islamic women's organisations too. They campaigned  through various mediums, such as newspaper articles, art, poetry, and song

After Zia: 1988–2008 

Since the end of General Zia's rule, Pakistan elected its first female prime minister - Benazir Bhutto. Some feminist legislative attempts were made, such as the founding of all-women police stations, and the appointing of female judges for the first time. Many of anti-feminist laws of General Zia era remained.

Post-Zia, activists have been able to produce research that has focused on strengthening the political voice of women, and inclusive democratic governance. They have also produced some of the first Pakistani research and awareness-raising material on the sexual and reproductive rights of women, environmental issues, and citizen-based initiatives for peace between India and Pakistan.

2008–2017 

Sharmeen Obaid-Chinoy

Malala Yousafzai

2018 – present 

The feminist movement in Pakistan entered a crucial period after 2008 with the advent of private media channels and social media. The movement gained momentum as women were increasingly able to share their ideas and beliefs. Aurat March (Women Marches) are now held in numerous cities over the country. The subjects and issues raised by the marches include increased political participation and representation of women, gender and sexual minorities, religious minorities and other marginalized groups in Pakistan. The movement has also demanded for public spaces to be made safer for women and transgender people, as well as called for an end to all violence against women and transgender people.

Liberal feminism in Pakistan 
Liberal feminism is most prominent in leftist liberal circles, and is often supported by left-leaning political parties such as PPP. It is often characterised by liberal values of freedom, liberty, human rights and secularism.

Nisaism 
Nisaism is more traditionalist in nature and supports the acquisition of women rights under an Islamic lens. The movement is mainly supported by centrists and the right-wing parties of Pakistan. The word Nisaism comes from Surah Nisa, a chapter of Qur'an, demonstrating the Islamic roots of the movement. The movement has faced some criticism for preaching Islamic rights and accepting what other secular feminist groups call the 'Islamic patriarchal structure of Pakistan'.

Feminist art and literature in Pakistan 

Much of Pakistani feminist art and literature struggles against orthodox advice literature, known for imposing religious dogma through puritanical reform; feminist authors often describe the journey of feminism in Pakistan as NO NEED OF AURAT MARCH SPREADING BEHAYAI NOT ACCORIDNG TO ISLAM an oscillating battle, theres no need of aurat march this type of aurat march its not needed this is behayai chill guys
where women's movements struggle against the continued backlash of the patriarchal hegemony. According to Shahbaz Ahmad Cheema, the Pakistani patriarchy produces literature and art with the ultimate goal of making women accept, internalize, and promote patriarchal discourse as an ideal. Afiya S Zia identifies some of the writings she considers to be most problematic, such as those of Sir Syed Ahmed Khan; Ashraf Ali Thanawi's Bahishti Zewar; and, in post-partition times, Abu Ala Maududi's writings, which she considers to intend to create and sustain a privileged Muslim class, further facilitating and supporting patriarchal male dominance. Television and Film likewise continue to present submissive and subservient Pakistani women in a male-dominated Pakistani society.

S.S. Sirajuddin in the Encyclopedia of Post-Colonial Literature in English, expresses reservations about the availability of free space for feminism in Pakistan, and feels that the nation is still much affected by religious fervor. However, she admits that awareness of feminist concerns, the changing role of women, and female identity do exist in Pakistan, and these concerns are reflected in Pakistan's English literature.

Perception and intervention of major female characters can be observed in novels like Bapsi Sidhwa, and Sara Suleri's Meatless Days. Pakistani poets like Maki Kureishi, Hina Faisal Imam, Alamgir Hashmi, and Taufiq Rafat have been considered to be sensitive but restrained in their portrayal.

One of the first feminist films in Pakistan was called Aurat Raj (Women's Rule). It was released in 1979, but failed to achieve at the box-office despite the fact that released in a successful period for Pakistani cinema.

Womansplaining: Navigating Activism, Politics and Modernity in Pakistan is 2021 collection of feminist essays edited by Sherry Rehman consisting of essays by Hina Jilani, Khawar Mumtaz, Afiya Shehrbano Zia and others narrating the history of the Muslim Family Law Ordinance, Women's Action Forum and various legislative changes in Pakistan's history. Sarah Peracha publishes to encourage women of Pakistan to do business which is against the norm in Pakistan to inspire women to work. Bina Shah and Fifi Haroon write about feminism and the arts, Nighat Dad tells about feminism in the digital age.

Ismat Chughtai 

Beginning in the 1930s, Ismat Chughtai wrote extensively on themes including female sexuality and femininity, middle-class gentility, and class conflict, often from a Marxist perspective.

Fatima Bhutto 
Fatima Bhutto is the daughter of former Minister Murtaza Bhutto. She is the author of three novels. Songs of Blood and Sword is a memoir of her father, who was assassinated.

Feminist organizations of Pakistan 
 Alliance Against Sexual Harassment at Work place (AASHA)
 All Pakistan Women's Association (APWA)
 Convention on the Elimination of All Forms of Discrimination Against Women  (CEDAW)
 Democratic Women's Association(DWA)
 Gender and Development
 National Commission on the Status of Women (NCSW)
 United Front for Women's Rights (UFWA)
 Women's Political Participation Project
 Tehrik-e-Niswan (The Women's Movement)
 Sindhiani Tahreek (Sindhi women's movement)
 Women Democratic Front
 Aurat Foundation
 Society for Appraisal and Women Empowerment in Rural Areas (SAWERA)
 Acid Survivors Trust International
 Pakistan Federation of Business and Professional Women
 Young Women's Christian Association (YWCA)
 Pakistan Women Lawyers' Association
 Women's Action Forum (WAF)
 Pax Femina
 Shirkat Gah
 Aurat March
 Malala Fund
 Girls at Dhabas
 Blue Veins
 Shemale Association for Fundamental Rights (SAFAR)
  Wajood (NGO on Transgender rights, run by Bubbli Malik)
 Akhuwat Khawajasira Program (Organization for Transgender rights, Prjoct Coordinator: Aradhiya Khan)
 All Pakistan Transgender Election Network (APTEN) (Chairperson Nayyab Ali)
 Pakistan Jamhooriat-Pasand Khwateen (Pakistan Women's Democratic Front)
 Dastak
 The Fearless Collective

Pakistani feminists 
 Atiya Fyzee Rahamin Known for passion in art, music, writing and education and travel; In 1926 at an educational conference at Aligarh, Fyzee defied expectations of Purdah seclusion and addressed the gathering unveiled (without Hijab) to demand equal rights with men to go about on God's earth freely and openly.
 Fatima Jinnah - One of the popular female figures in Pakistan to date. She was a source of the awakening of women's rights in Pakistan.
 Begum Ra'ana Liaquat Ali Khan - Founded Pakistan Women National Guards (PWNG), and helped established the Pakistan Woman Naval Reserves
 Asma Barlas - Pakistani-American professor at Ithaca College, and author of "Believing Women" in Islam: Unreading Patriarchal Interpretations of the Qur'an
 Mukhtaran Bibi - Pakistani advocate for rape prevention and women's rights
 Zaib-un-Nissa Hamidullah - Pakistan's first woman columnist and editor, first woman to speak at Al-Azhar University, and author of The Bull and the She Devil
 Riffat Hassan - Pakistani-American theologian and scholar of the Qur'an
 Zilla Huma Usman - Pakistani politician and activist, assassinated Feb 2007
 Benazir Bhutto - Prime Minister of Pakistan, assassinated December 27, 2007
 Nida Mahmoed - Pakistan based first feminist English poet 
 Malala Yousafzai - Pakistani activist for female education and the youngest-ever Nobel Prize laureate.

Bibliography 
 Yaqin, Amina. Gender, Sexuality and Feminism in Pakistani Urdu Writing. United Kingdom, Anthem Press. (review)
 Manzoor, Asma . "Aurat Justuju Aur Nisai Andaz E Fikar". Pakistan Journal of Gender Studies, vol. 21, no. 2, Sept. 2021, pp. 153–4,
 Feminism, Postfeminism and Legal Theory: Beyond the Gendered Subject?. United Kingdom, Taylor & Francis, 2018.

See also 
 Acid throwing
 Aurat March
 Honour killing in Pakistan
 Me Too movement (Pakistan)
 Modesty patrol
 Mera Jisam Meri Marzi
 Rape in Pakistan
 Swara
 Vani
 Women in Arab societies
 
 Women's rights
 Women in Pakistan
 Islamic Feminism
 Women in Islam
 Women related laws in Pakistan

References

External links 
 Dr. Salima passed away Founder of the Pakistan Federation of Business & Professional Women's Organisation

 
Women in Pakistan
Pakistan